The women's shot put event at the 2017 European Athletics Indoor Championships was held on 3 March 2015 at 10:50 (qualification) and at 17:35 (final) local time.

Medalists

Records

Results

Qualification 
Qualification: Qualifying performance 17.70 (Q) or at least 8 best performers (q) advance to the Final.

Final

References 

2017 European Athletics Indoor Championships
Shot put at the European Athletics Indoor Championships